Nelson is a town and civil parish in Pendle, Lancashire, England.  It contains 38 listed buildings that are recorded in the National Heritage List for England.  Of these, one is at Grade II*, the middle grade, and the others are at Grade II, the lowest grade.   The parish contains the town of Nelson and surrounding countryside.  Originally an agricultural area, the first mill arrived in 1780, and by the 19th century cotton weaving, which has since declined, was the dominant industry.  Most of the listed buildings are houses, farmhouses, and farm buildings.  The Leeds and Liverpool Canal passes through the parish, and the listed building associated with this are three bridges and a canalside warehouse.  Other than the warehouse, there are no listed industrial buildings.  The other listed buildings include a medieval stone, three churches, a set of stocks, a hotel, cemetery buildings, and a memorial.


Key

Buildings

Notes and references

Notes

Citations

Sources

Lists of listed buildings in Lancashire
Buildings and structures in the Borough of Pendle
Listed